John Hadfield Bennett (11 August 1885 – 25 May 1973) was an English field hockey player from Chorlton, Lancashire, who competed in the 1920 Summer Olympics.He was a member of the British field hockey team, which won the gold medal.  He also played cricket for Berkshire in the Minor Counties Championship from 1906 to 1908. His brother George played cricket at first-class level.

References

External links
 
profile

1885 births
1973 deaths
English male field hockey players
English Olympic medallists
Olympic field hockey players of Great Britain
British male field hockey players
Field hockey players at the 1920 Summer Olympics
Olympic gold medallists for Great Britain
Olympic medalists in field hockey
English cricketers
Berkshire cricketers
Medalists at the 1920 Summer Olympics